John Österlund (born 21 August 1875 in Stockholm, died 17 February 1953) was a Swedish artist and curator.

Österlund studied decorative painting at the Technical School's senior art and design department and was a student at the Art Academy in 1903 as he did with the chancellor medal. He then studied further during trips to Europe's art centers. He arrived shortly afterwards to live in Uppsala, and was to spend the majority of their designs to Uppsala. Although the West Coast, primarily Mollosund where he often spent summers became a frequent recurring motif in Österlunds art. Although Visby became interested in Österlund, and illustrated including Carl af Uggla book about staaden. In sintt måler Österlund had its roots in 1890s National Romanticism. There was, however, mainly as a conservator of paintings and church paintings Österlund came to be known. Among his many church painting restorations include Upplands-Ekeby church in 1927, Stavby, Roslags-Bro and Vaksala churches in 1928, Ärentuna and Skogs-Tibble churches in 1929 parish church, Kumla, Tortuna, Möklinta, Huddunge, Vittinge, Kila, Haapasaari, Botkyrkavägen, Grangärdesgatan in the 1930s and Husby-Rekarne and Torsåker during the 1940s. Österlund also was a model builder; he constructed a model of the Royal Palace of Stockholm Three Crowns State Museum as well as models for the State Historical Museum, and Gothenburg's historical museum.

Österlund was in the later years chairman of Upplands Art Association.

References

Artists from Stockholm
1875 births
1953 deaths
20th-century Swedish painters
Swedish male painters
Burials at Uppsala old cemetery
20th-century Swedish male artists